Beau Broadway is a lost 1928 American drama silent film directed by Malcolm St. Clair and written by F. Hugh Herbert, George O'Hara and Ralph Spence. The film stars Lew Cody, Aileen Pringle, Sue Carol, Hugh Trevor and Heinie Conklin. The film was released on August 15, 1928, by Metro-Goldwyn-Mayer.

Cast 
Lew Cody as Jim Lambert
Aileen Pringle as Yvonne
Sue Carol as Mona
Hugh Trevor as Killer Gordon
Heinie Conklin as Dijuha
Kit Guard as Prof. Griswold
Jack Herrick as Dr. Monahan
James J. Jeffries as Gunner O'Brien

References

External links 
 

1928 films
1920s English-language films
Silent American drama films
1928 drama films
Metro-Goldwyn-Mayer films
Films directed by Malcolm St. Clair
American black-and-white films
American silent feature films
Lost American films
1928 lost films
Lost drama films
1920s American films